Tân Hưng may refer to:

Tân Hưng District, Vietnam
Tân Hưng, Bắc Giang, Vietnam
Tân Hưng, Ca Mau, Vietnam